Sein Gay Har (SGH) is a major Burmese retailer. Sein Gay Har began as a market in Rangoon's Chinatown in 1985. The company runs major shopping centers in Yangon.

References

See also
City Mart Holdings
Gamone Pwint

Buildings and structures in Yangon
Shopping malls and markets in Myanmar
Retail companies of Myanmar
Retail companies established in 1985
1985 establishments in Burma